Patika Kusulaka (Kharosthi:) was an Indo-Scythian satrap in the northwestern South Asia during the 1st century BCE.

Name

Reign

He is mentioned in the Mathura lion capital. He is also mentioned in the Taxila copper plate inscription (Konow 1929: 23-29), dated between 90 and 6 BCE. In the scroll Patika is said to be the son of the Satrap of Chukhsa, Liaka Kusuluka.

Zeionises (Jihonika) may have succeeded Patika around 20–40 CE.

References

External links
Dates for Kanishka and the Indo-Scythians

Indo-Scythian satraps
1st-century BC Iranian monarchs
1st-century BC Iranian people